The Pas/Grace Lake Airport  is an airport adjacent to The Pas, Manitoba, Canada.

Airlines
Missinippi Airways provides a daily schedule to Pukatawagan Airport (CZFG), as well as 24-hour Medivac and charter services.

See also
The Pas Airport
The Pas/Grace Lake Water Aerodrome

References

Certified airports in Manitoba

Transport in The Pas